In Inuit mythology, Akycha is a solar goddess worshipped in Alaska.

See also
 List of solar deities

Notes

Inuit goddesses
Solar goddesses